Filip Krajinović was the defending champion but chose not to defend his title.

Juan Ignacio Londero won the title after defeating Hugo Dellien 3–6, 7–5, 6–4 in the final.

Seeds

Draw

Finals

Top half

Bottom half

References
Main Draw
Qualifying Draw

Marburg Open - Singles
2018 Singles